Serine-threonine kinase receptor-associated protein is an enzyme that in humans is encoded by the STRAP gene.

Interactions 

STRAP has been shown to interact with:

 Mothers against decapentaplegic homolog 2,
 Mothers against decapentaplegic homolog 3, 
 Mothers against decapentaplegic homolog 6, 
 Mothers against decapentaplegic homolog 7, 
 TGF beta receptor 1,  and
 TGF beta receptor 2.

References

Further reading